James Aitken may refer to:

James Aitken (bishop) (1612/3–1687), Scottish Episcopal bishop
James Aitken (footballer) (1882–1915), Australian rules footballer
James Aitken (priest) (1829–1908), Church of England priest and multi-sports player
James Alfred Aitken (1846–1897), Scottish painter
James Macrae Aitken (1908–1983), Scottish chess player
James Smith Aitken (1881–1964), politician in Saskatchewan, Canada
Jim Aitken (born 1947), British businessman and former Scotland international rugby union player
Jimmy Aitken (1872–1944), former Australian rules footballer
John the Painter (1752–1777), also known as James Aitken, Scot who committed acts of terror in British naval dockyards in 1776–77